The Super Y League is a youth soccer league with teams from the United States and Canada. Founded in 1999, the Super Y League is dedicated to the progression of future professional players and has steered the course for development of elite clubs, players and coaches. Affiliated with U.S. Soccer, the Super Y League has opened countless doors for players to be identified for U.S. National Team programs. The Super Y League contains the youth academies of Major League Soccer, United Soccer League and Premier Development League clubs. The league also serves clubs looking to develop the game from the ground up.

The Super Y League operates the following age groups: U-12, U-13, U-14, U-15, U-16/17, U-18/19. From 2006 to 2015, the oldest age group was branded as the Super-20 League.

Former clubs

References

External links 
Official website

 
United Soccer League
Youth soccer leagues in the United States
1999 establishments in the United States
Sports leagues established in 1999